Absolutely Fabulous: The Movie is a 2016 comedy film directed by Mandie Fletcher, written by Jennifer Saunders and based on the television series Absolutely Fabulous. It stars Saunders, Joanna Lumley, Julia Sawalha, June Whitfield (in her final film role) and Jane Horrocks, reprising their roles from the series. The film finds the drug-addicted, alcoholic PR agent Edina Monsoon and her best friend/codependent Patsy Stone on the run from the authorities after it is suspected they killed supermodel Kate Moss. The film serves as a de facto series finale for the show.

Principal photography began on 12 October 2015 in the South of France. The film premiered in London on 29 June 2016 and was released theatrically by Fox Searchlight Pictures in the United Kingdom on 1 July 2016 and in the United States on 22 July 2016.

Plot
The ever-glamorous and self-indulgent Edina Monsoon and Patsy Stone are now in their 60s. Edina's PR company is in decline and her attempt to release an autobiography falls through when a publisher rejects the manuscript. While setting up designer Huki Muki's fashion event, Patsy learns that supermodel Kate Moss is looking for a new PR agent, and immediately calls Edina to inform her. Their phone call is overheard by Edina's PR rival Claudia Bing when Edina accidentally leaves her phone on speaker.

Edina and Patsy attend the fashion event with Edina's 13-year-old granddaughter Jane (who Edina calls "Lola"), while Saffron "Saffy" Monsoon, Edina's daughter and Jane's mother, goes out on a date with her new boyfriend Nick. Edina finds Kate Moss on a balcony overlooking the Thames. When both Edina and Claudia attempt to approach Kate, Edina accidentally topples Kate into the river. Among the witnesses is Lulu, one of Edina's remaining clients, who is at odds with Edina after being replaced as a performer at the event.

Hysteria pervades the event as Kate is presumed dead. The media immediately storm the scene to report her disappearance and assumed death. Edina and Patsy, along with Jane, are taken into police custody. Saffy arrives to see them with Nick, who is revealed to be a police detective.

After being released the following day, Edina becomes the target of hate mail and Internet trolls, while Patsy has been fired from her job because of her association with Edina. At night, the pair take a boat to the Thames to search for Kate's body, using Edina's personal assistant Bubble as a searching device, but she disappears into the water. They decide to flee the country before the media firestorm worsens, taking Jane and her credit card along. The three land in Cannes, while back in London, Saffy desperately searches for Jane, eventually discovering Edina's whereabouts through her stylist, Christopher.

In Cannes, Edina and Patsy try to devise money-making schemes. After Patsy fails to convince a wealthy former lover to marry her, the two happen upon an elderly baroness who is the richest woman in the world. In order to gain access to her fortune, Patsy disguises herself as a man named Pat Stone and flirts with her. The following day, Patsy marries the baroness, granting Edina and Patsy the lavish lifestyle they had been pursuing, as they stay in a luxury hotel with Dame Joan Collins and Dame Edna Everage as fellow guests.

Meanwhile, Emma Bunton, who saw Edina and Patsy in public, tells Lulu about their whereabouts. Lulu flies out to Cannes and meets with Bubble, who is alive and has bought a massive Cannes pavilion after embezzling money from Edina's company for years. Saffy arrives in Cannes with Nick and immediately heads to the hotel to find Jane, who is with Emma.

A vengeful Lulu reports Edina and Patsy's location to the police. The police find Edina and Patsy and chase them through the town, the duo escaping in a hijacked three-wheeled delivery van. As they reach Bubble's pavilion, the van's brakes fail and they roll backwards and fall into an infinity pool attached to Bubble's house. Saffy arrives at the scene to find Edina and Patsy slowly sinking into the pool, still inside the van. Edina apologises to Saffy for being greedy, self-centred and a neglectful mother. In response, Saffy tells her that she loves her. When Bubble reveals that Kate Moss is alive, Edina immediately exits the van, realising she is innocent.

People all over the world celebrate the fact that Kate Moss is alive. As Kate's new PR, Edina revitalises her own career and finally launches her autobiography, while Kate has been in even more demand since she was found. At Saffy's insistence, Patsy reluctantly reveals to the baroness that she is in fact a woman, not a man called "Pat". The baroness, in turn, reveals that she is actually a man.

Cast

Uncredited cast

Celebrity cameos
Multiple celebrity cameo appearances in the film were announced over the course of filming. In April 2016, Fox and the BBC confirmed a list of 60 cameos, most of which had not yet been announced, that would be featured in the film. They include:

Approximately 90 drag queens appeared in the film, including Daniel Lismore, The Vivienne and Charlie Hides.

Production

Development
Saunders wrote and starred in Absolutely Fabulous, a British television sitcom for the BBC, which originally ran for three series from 1992 to 1995, with intermittent additional series and specials until 2012. Absolutely Fabulous features the champagne-fueled duo of "international PR guru" Edina Monsoon (Saunders) and "sex-crazed magazine editor" Patsy Stone (Lumley). Additional characters include Edina's overly serious daughter Saffron (Sawalha), her daffy mother (Whitfield) and her even daffier assistant Bubble (Horrocks).

Writing

Deadline Hollywood broke the story in November 2011 that Saunders planned to begin writing a film version of the series in 2012. The film would begin with Edina and Patsy waking up hungover after a party on an oligarch's yacht, with everyone else gone and the boat somewhere the middle of the ocean. Saunders later said that she hoped to shoot the film on the French Riviera. In March 2012, Saunders confirmed that she was working on the script. She said of the plot: "Eddy and Patsy are looking for what they imagine glamorous life should be. They're constantly searching for that perfect place to sit or that perfect pair of sunglasses. It's Shangri-La and it just might be round the next corner. In the meantime, they decide to take Saffy's daughter off her—she calls her Jane, I call her Lola—but then they lose her."

Calling herself the "worst procrastinator in the world", Saunders said in January 2014: "Yes, well I have to do it now because I've threatened to a lot ... And then she [Lumley] kept announcing it and saying, "Yes, she's going to do it," and then Dawn French on our radio show at Christmas said, "I bet £100,000 that you don't write it," so now I have to write it, otherwise I have to pay her £100,000 ... Once you've had a bit of success, the last thing you want to do is go and make a flop. So the biggest fear in me is that it won't be good enough. I'm really nervous about it."

In April 2014, Saunders again confirmed on BBC Breakfast that she was in the process of writing the film. In April 2015, Saunders explained her delay with the script, saying, "I think that's why I didn't do it for a while ... I thought, 'Wouldn't it be awful if it was awful.'" She then quipped, "but we're all so old, and Joanna [Lumley] said to me, 'Do it before we die!' We're all on the brink." Saunders also noted, "[The film] involves all the main characters and virtually everyone that's ever been in the series—all those characters". Lumley confirmed in July 2015 that the film's script was finished and that production would begin in October. She said of the project, "We are all there, the same old gang ... It is going to be ravishingly funny! Very gorgeous ... and completely fabulous!"

Production and filming
In August 2015, Deadline Hollywood reported that "all of the original main cast" were confirmed, with Fox Searchlight Pictures in negotiations to co-finance and co-produce the film with BBC Films, and to handle worldwide distribution. It was also announced that Mandie Fletcher would direct, with Jon Plowman and Damian Jones as producers and Saunders, French and Maureen Vincent as executive producers. Deadline Hollywood later reported that Christine Langan, Steve Milne, Christian Eisenbeiss and  Nichola Martin were also executive producing, with DanTram Nguyen, Vice President of Production and Katie Goodson-Thomas, Director of Production overseeing the project for Fox Searchlight Pictures.

Principal photography began on 12 October 2015 in South of France. The BBC and Fox Searchlight subsequently released a promotional image of Saunders and Lumley in character on a yacht. Along with Sawalha, Whitfield and Horrocks, Kathy Burke was confirmed to be reprising her role as Magda, and Kate Moss, Emma Bunton and Lulu would appear in guest roles as themselves, as they had in the TV series. The cameo appearances of Harry Styles, Kelly Hoppen and Kim Kardashian were also announced as filming began. Multiple other celebrity cameos were announced during production, culminating with a 60-name list released in April 2016. Deadline Hollywoods Ali Jaafar wrote of the film's plot in October 2015: "Edina and Patsy are still oozing glitz and glamour, living the high life they are accustomed to; shopping, drinking and clubbing their way around London’s trendiest hotspots. Blamed for a major incident at an uber fashionable launch party, they become entangled in a media storm and are relentlessly pursued by the paparazzi. Fleeing penniless to the glamorous playground of the super-rich, the French Riviera, they hatch a plan to make their escape permanent and live the high life forevermore!"

Controversy
In December 2015, the film sparked controversy and accusations of racism when it was announced that white Scottish comedian Janette Tough would be playing a Japanese character named Huki Muki. Korean-American comedian Margaret Cho accused the film of "yellowface", which she described as "when white people portray Asian people. And unfortunately it's happening in this film." Upon release of the film it became apparent that the character was not, in fact, Japanese but Scottish. When asked about the controversy, Saunders replied that "the whole film is about people being what they're not, Huki Muki is a brand, she is the designer and she looks a bit Japanese, but the moment she opens her mouth she's from Glasgow. There's no yellow makeup..."

Music and soundtrack
On 10 June 2016, Australian singer Kylie Minogue released a cover version of the series' theme song "This Wheel's on Fire" as the official theme for the film. The soundtrack, which also includes songs from Paloma Faith (whose "Ready for the Good Life" appears in the film's trailer), La Roux, Jason Derulo, Eartha Kitt, Nancy Sinatra, Santigold and others, was released on 1 July 2016 via Rhino Records. It debuted at number 38 on the ARIA Albums Chart in Australia on 6 August.

Release

Premiere, theatrical release and home media
Absolutely Fabulous: The Movie had its world premiere at the Odeon Leicester Square in London on 29 June 2016. The film was released theatrically in the United Kingdom on 1 July 2016 by 20th Century Fox, and was subsequently released in the UK on DVD and Blu-ray on 5 December 2016. In the United States, it was released in select theaters on 22 July 2016 by Fox Searchlight Pictures.

Reception

Box office
Absolutely Fabulous: The Movie has grossed $39.2 million worldwide, including $19.5 million in the United Kingdom, $4.7 million in the United States and $6.2 million in Australia.

Critical response
On review aggregator Rotten Tomatoes, the film holds an approval rating of 58% based on 157 reviews; the average rating is 5.52/10. The site's critical consensus reads, "Absolutely Fabulous: The Movie picks up pretty much where its source material left off, delivering an adaptation that, as fans of this British export might say, does what it says on the tin." On Metacritic, the film has a score of 59 out of 100 based on 35 critics, indicating "mixed or average reviews".

Awards and nominations

Planned sequel
Saunders had at one point hinted that a sequel would be considered if the film performed well at the box office. However, on 29 November 2016, Saunders confirmed that she is "not doing anything more with Ab Fab", as she wants to focus on new projects and spend more time with her family.

References

External links
 
 
 
 

Movie
2016 films
2016 comedy films
2016 LGBT-related films
2010s American films
2010s British films
2010s buddy comedy films
2010s English-language films
2010s female buddy films
American buddy comedy films
American female buddy films
American LGBT-related films
BBC Film films
British buddy comedy films
British female buddy films
British LGBT-related films
Casting controversies in film
Cross-dressing in British films
Drag (clothing)-related films
Film controversies in the United Kingdom
Films about fashion in the United Kingdom
Films based on television series
Films directed by Mandie Fletcher
Films scored by Jake Monaco
Films set in Cannes
Films set in London
Films shot in France
Films shot in London
LGBT-related comedy films
Race-related controversies in film
TSG Entertainment films